The 2022 Arab Cup U-20 was the sixth edition of the Arab Cup U-20. On 14 April 2022, the Union of Arab Football Associations granted Saudi Arabia the right to host. The tournament took place from 20 July to 7 August.

Saudi Arabia were the defending champions, having won the previous edition in 2021. Saudi Arabia successfully defended their title by beating Egypt in the final.

Teams 
The draw took place on 26 June 2022 in Dammam, Saudi Arabia.

In addition, there are no invited teams in this edition.

Seedings

Venues

Officiating 

Referees
  Youssef Qamouh
  Mohammad Khaled
  Mohamed Maarouf
  Yousif Saeed 
  Saddam Amara
  Abdullah Al-Kandari 
  Sheikh Ahmed Aladdin
  Mohamed Alshahome 
  Jalal Jayed
  Abdel Aziz Mohamed Bouh
  Omar Al-Yaqoubi
  Abdul Hadi Al-Ruwaili
  Sami Al Garisi 
  Abdulaziz Jaafar
  Naim Hosni
  Sultan Al-Hammadi

Assistant referees
  Ayan Adel
  Abdullah Sharma
  Sami Helhal
  Ali Fakih
  Mohamed Al-Araibi
  Mohamed Mahmoud Youssef
  Abdullah Abrat
  Abdullah Al-Jerdani
  Ashraf Abu Zubaydah
  Hisham Al-Rifai
  Rami Tohme
  Fawzi Al-Jeridi
  Masoud Hassan
  Ibrahim Saleh Hosni

Squads 

Players born on or after 1 January 2002 are eligible to participate.

Group stage 
The group winners and the two best second-placed teams advance to the quarter-finals.

Group A

Group B

Group C

Group D

Group E

Group F

Ranking of second-placed teams

Knockout stage

Bracket

Quarter-finals

Semi-finals

Final 
The match date was postponed for one day for unspecified reasons.

Statistics

Goalscorers

Broadcasting rights
Below the list of the broadcasting rights:

References 

Arab Cup U-20
Arab Cup
Arab Cup
International association football competitions hosted by Saudi Arabia
Arab Cup
Arab Cup